The Lasanen Site, designated 20MA21, is an archaeological site located in St. Ignace, Michigan. It was listed on the National Register of Historic Places in 1971.

Description
The Lasanen Site is located within the city of St. Ignace, on what was once a beach ridge above the Straits of Mackinac.
The site is a burial ground associated with the Iroquois culture. Five more burial pits were found on adjacent property.

History
The Lasanen Site was discovered in 1966, when a private landowner, Dr. W. C. Lasanen, unearthed human remains while excavating to construct a foundation.  Lasanen notified the Mackinac Island State Park Commission, and urgent salvage excavations were undertaken to recover the exposed human burials. Later in 1966, C. E. Cleland from Michigan State University, along with some students, undertook further excavations at the site. These excavations continued into 1967.

The details unearthed at the burials are consistent with those witnessed and described by Antoine Laumet Cadillac in 1694–97, and may be the same.

References

Further reading

Geography of Mackinac County, Michigan
Archaeological sites on the National Register of Historic Places in Michigan
National Register of Historic Places in Mackinac County, Michigan